Devil's bite is a common name for several plants and may refer to:

Liatris scariosa, native to eastern North America, producing purple flowers
Veratrum viride, native to North America, producing green flowers

See also
Devilsbit